Centenary Methodist Church is a historic Methodist church located at New Bern, Craven County, North Carolina.  It was built in 1904–1905, and is an irregularly shaped, brick multiple-use church complex.  The front facade includes an entrance five-bay arcade beneath a low conical roof flanked by square corner towers of unequal height. Nowadays the building belongs to The United Methodist Church.

It was listed on the National Register of Historic Places in 1972.

External links
 Centenary United Methodist Church, New Bern (NC): Our History

References

United Methodist churches in North Carolina
Churches on the National Register of Historic Places in North Carolina
Churches completed in 1904
20th-century Methodist church buildings in the United States
Churches in New Bern, North Carolina
National Register of Historic Places in Craven County, North Carolina